Asmodeus, in comics, may refer to:
 Asmodeus (Marvel Comics), a Marvel Comics demon
 Asmodeus, a character in the manga series Angel Sanctuary
 Asmodeus, a character in the webcomic Megatokyo
 Alice Asmodeus, a character in the manga series Welcome to Demon School! Iruma-kun

See also
 Asmodeus (disambiguation)